NV-5138 is an orally and centrally active small-molecule drug which is under development by Navitor Pharmaceuticals for the treatment of major depressive disorder (MDD). It directly and selectively activates the mammalian target of rapamycin complex 1 (mTORC1) signaling pathway by binding to and modulating sestrin2, a leucine amino acid sensor and upstream regulatory pathway. The mTORC1 pathway is the same signaling pathway that the NMDA receptor antagonist ketamine activates in the medial prefrontal cortex (mPFC) to mediate its rapid-acting antidepressant effects. A single oral dose of NV-5138 has been found to increase mTORC1 signaling and produce synaptogenesis in the mPFC and to induce rapid antidepressant effects in multiple animal models of depression. Like those of ketamine, these actions require the signaling of brain-derived neurotrophic factor (BDNF). The antidepressant effects following a single dose of NV-5138 are long-lasting, with a duration of up to 7 days, and are similar to those of ketamine. Based on these promising preclinical findings, efforts are underway to assess NV-5138 in clinical trials with human subjects. By November 2019, NV-5138 had completed three phase I studies for the treatment of MDD. In these studies, preliminary evidence of efficacy, tolerability, safety, and pharmacokinetics was observed, and as of 2021 it was into Phase II trials.

See also 
 List of investigational antidepressants

References

External links 
 NV-5138 - AdisInsight
 NV-5138 for Treatment-Resistant Depression - Navitor Pharmaceuticals
 Sestrin2 modulator NV-5138, shows ketamine-like rapid antidepressant effects via direct activation of mTORC1 signaling - Navitor Pharmaceuticals
 Navitor Pharmaceuticals to Develop NV-5138, a Specific Activator of mTORC1 for Treatment-Resistant Depression, Based on Promising Data Presented at Society for Neuroscience 2017 - BusinessWire

Antidepressants
Experimental drugs
Non-proteinogenic amino acids